Joe Palmer (born  in Yorkshire) was a football manager, who was the first man to manage both Bristol City and Bristol Rovers.

Palmer was in charge of Bristol Rovers from May 1926 until April 1929, and was manager of Bristol City between 1919 and 1921. Between these spells he was trainer of Bradford Park Avenue.

References

English football managers
Bristol City F.C. managers
Bristol Rovers F.C. managers
Football managers from Yorkshire
1890s births
Year of birth uncertain

Year of death missing